Traité de documentation: le livre sur le livre, théorie et pratique is a landmark book by Belgian author Paul Otlet, first published in 1934.

Legacy

The book is considered a landmark in the history of information science, with concepts predicting the rise of the World Wide Web and search engines.

See also
 Mundaneum
 Traité de documentation on Wikisource.

References

External links

Paul Otlet, Pioneer of Information Management
Traité de documentation : le livre sur le livre, théorie et pratique at Google Books
Internet Dreamers: Paul Otlet
“The Web That Wasn’t” and “Augmenting Human Intellect”
Internet Visionary Paul Otlet: Networked Knowledge, Decades Before Google

Information science
1934 non-fiction books